Florin Zalomir (21 April 1981 – 3 October 2022) was a Romanian sabre fencer who competed in the 2012 Summer Olympics winning a silver medal in the sabre team event.

Personal life

After the 2003 European Fencing Championships from Bourges, France, Zalomir joined the Foreign Legion. He returned to sport after two and a half years of engagement in France and Afghanistan.

Zalomir committed suicide on 3 October 2022.

References

External links

 Profile at the European Fencing Confederation
 

1981 births
2022 deaths
2022 suicides
Romanian male sabre fencers
Fencers at the 2012 Summer Olympics
Olympic fencers of Romania
Sportspeople from Iași
Olympic medalists in fencing
Olympic silver medalists for Romania
Medalists at the 2012 Summer Olympics
Soldiers of the French Foreign Legion
Suicides by firearm in Romania